Welcome to Marwen is a 2018 American drama film directed by Robert Zemeckis, who co-wrote the script with Caroline Thompson. It is inspired by Jeff Malmberg's 2010 documentary Marwencol. The film stars Steve Carell in the lead role, Leslie Mann, Diane Kruger, Merritt Wever, Janelle Monáe, Eiza González, Gwendoline Christie, Leslie Zemeckis, Siobhan Williams and Neil Jackson, and follows the true story of Mark Hogancamp, a man struggling with PTSD who, after being physically assaulted, creates a fictional village to ease his trauma.

Welcome to Marwen was released by Universal Pictures on December 21, 2018. The film received mainly negative reviews from critics, who praised the animated segments and performances, particularly Carell's, but criticized the inconsistent tone and screenplay. The film grossed only $13 million worldwide, becoming a box-office bomb.

Plot
A World War II warplane piloted by a doll-like figure is hit by enemy fire and forced to ditch. The pilot's shoes are burned in the landing and he finds women's shoes, which he wears instead. The pilot is confronted by doll-like German soldiers, who taunt him for wearing women's shoes. The Germans threaten to emasculate him, but are killed by a group of doll-like women who come to the pilot's rescue and protect him.

It is revealed that the scenario is part of an elaborate fantasy created by Mark Hogancamp, using modified fashion dolls in a model village named Marwen. Mark imagines that the dolls are alive and photographs his fantasies to help him cope with acute memory loss and post-traumatic stress disorder from a brutal attack he suffered some time earlier, when he drunkenly told a group of white supremacists that he was a cross-dresser.

The dolls correspond to people that he knows in real life: himself as "Cap'n Hogie", the pilot; various female friends as his protectors; and his attackers as German Nazi soldiers. The main villain of Marwen Dejah Thoris, a teal-haired Belgian witch obsessed with Hogie, to the point where she would send any woman who gets too close to him 15,000,000 lightyears into the future with her magic.

Mark finally agrees to appear in court to deliver a victim impact statement after much coaxing from his attorney and friends, but upon seeing his attackers, he imagines them as Nazi soldiers shooting at him, and becomes terrified and flees, causing Judge Martha J. Harter to postpone the hearing.

Mark falls in love with a woman named Nicol who has just moved in across the street, whom he has added to his fantasy. Mark imagines that the doll Nicol is in love with Cap'n Hogie, and that they get married. In real life, Mark proposes marriage to Nicol, who tells him she wishes to remain only friends. Mark is distraught and contemplates suicide.

In his fantasies, Nicol is shot by a Nazi, who in turn is killed by Cap'n Hogie but brought back to life, along with other Nazi soldiers, by Deja Thoris. Cap'n Hogie realizes that Deja Thoris is both a Nazi spy and the personification of Mark's addiction to the pills that he thought were helping him, but were actually hurting him. Hogie saves Mark by vanquishing Dejah 15,000,000 lightyears into the future, never to be seen again. Mark pours the pills down the sink and vows to break his addiction to them.

Mark attends the rescheduled hearing and delivers his statement. That evening he also attends the exhibition of his work and makes a date with his friend Roberta, who is a sales clerk at the hobby store where he is a frequent customer. The film ends with a photograph of the real Mark Hogancamp, who has a successful career as a photographer.

Cast
Most of the cast appears both as characters in the "real world", and as characters in the Marwen world that Mark created, using motion-capture and lending their voice for the animated character.

Ulster County Sheriffs portrayed by Fraser Aitcheson, Trevor Jones, Brad Kelly, Jeff Sanca, and Patrick Sabongui.

Production
On April 28, 2017, it was announced that Robert Zemeckis would next direct an untitled drama film that would star Steve Carell. On May 19, 2017, it was reported that Leslie Mann and Janelle Monáe had joined the cast, and on May 23, 2017, Eiza González was also added. In June 2017, Diane Kruger joined the cast to portray a villain, while Gwendoline Christie had also signed on. In July 2017, Merritt Wever and Neil Jackson joined the cast of the film. On August 6, 2017, the studio hired German actor Falk Hentschel to play the role of a villain, Hauptsturmführer Ludwig Topf, a Nazi captain to a squad of SS Storm Troopers who terrify the people of Marwen. On August 21, 2017, the director's wife, Leslie Zemeckis, was cast in the film; she plays an actress in a pornographic film that Hogancamp watches, and her Marwen counterpart.

Principal photography on the film began in Vancouver, British Columbia, Canada, on August 14, 2017, and was completed around October 19, 2017.

In June 2018, the film was officially titled Welcome to Marwen.

Music 
The film's soundtrack was scored, composed and conducted by Alan Silvestri.

Release
The film was released in the United States by Universal Pictures on December 21, 2018. The studio spent $60 million on prints and advertising for the film. The original plan was to spend $120 million, but after early test screenings went poorly, costs were cut.

Reception

Box office
Welcome to Marwen grossed $10.8 million in the United States and Canada, and $2.3 million in other territories, for a worldwide total of $13.1 million, against a production budget of around $39 million.

In the United States and Canada, the film was released alongside Aquaman, Second Act and Bumblebee, and was projected to gross $7–9 million from 1,900 theaters over its five-day opening weekend. After making $909,000 on its first day (including $190,000 from Thursday night previews), three-day weekend estimates were lowered to $3 million. The film went on to debut to $2.4 million for the weekend, finishing ninth and marking the worst opening of Zemeckis' career. It then made $490,000 on Monday and $1.3 million on Christmas Day for an "awful" five-day total gross of $4.1 million. Following its low opening, insiders estimated the film would lose Universal $50–60 million, the second straight week the studio released a film that was a box-office bomb, following Mortal Engines. The film made $2.2 million in its second weekend, dropping 5%.

Critical response
The website's critical consensus reads, "Welcome to Marwen has dazzling effects and a sadly compelling story, but the movie's disjointed feel and clumsy screenplay make this invitation easy to decline." On Metacritic, the film has a weighted average score of 40 out of 100, based on 38 critics, indicating "mixed or average reviews". Audiences polled by CinemaScore gave the film an average grade of "B−" on an A+ to F scale, while those at PostTrak gave it a 57% overall positive score and a 37% "definite recommend".

Writing for IndieWire, David Ehrlich gave the film a "C" and wrote, "In trying to celebrate the healing powers of art, Zemeckis has created a sometimes fun, often morbidly compelling, and always ill-advised testament to the ways in which those healing powers can create problems of their own." Michael Phillips of the Chicago Tribune gave the film 1.5 out of 4 stars and said, "The way Zemeckis shapes these stop-motion animation scenes, they're meant to be exciting, funny, scary, a little of everything. But they whack the movie completely off-kilter. We lose the strange, quiet intimacy of Hogancamp's careful manipulation of this world. The real-life scenes don’t feel like Hogancamp's real life; they feel like a Hollywood falsification of it, despite Carell's and Mann's valiant efforts."

Contrarily, Richard Roeper of The Chicago Sun-Times praised the film, giving it 3.5/4 stars and saying, "Leave it to the innovative and greatly skilled veteran director Robert Zemeckis to deliver a beautiful and endearingly eccentric movie based on the life and the imagination of Mark Hogancamp. And leave it to the chameleon everyman Steve Carell to deliver a subtle, layered, empathetic and memorable portrayal of Mark — both the man and the doll."

Glenn Garner, writing in Out, noted that "Zemeckis’ film surprisingly features a prominent and respectful depiction of Hogancamp's gender expansive dress, making it a potentially valuable form of representation for gender nonconforming viewers. It seems a missed opportunity as that detail was largely omitted from the film's marketing."

Accolades

References

External links
 
 

2018 films
2018 biographical drama films
2010s fantasy drama films
2010s psychological drama films
2018 war drama films
American films with live action and animation
American biographical drama films
American fantasy drama films
American psychological drama films
American war drama films
2010s English-language films
Fantasy war films
Films shot in Vancouver
Films using motion capture
American World War II films
DreamWorks Pictures films
ImageMovers films
Perfect World Pictures films
Universal Pictures films
Films scored by Alan Silvestri
Films directed by Robert Zemeckis
Films with screenplays by Robert Zemeckis
Cross-dressing in American films
Films about dolls
Films about Nazis
Films set in Belgium
Films set in New York (state)
Films set in 2000
Films with screenplays by Caroline Thompson
2018 drama films
Films about post-traumatic stress disorder
Films produced by Robert Zemeckis
2010s American films